The Patty Kazmaier Memorial Award is given to the top female college ice hockey player in the United States. The award is presented during the women's annual ice hockey championship, the Frozen Four. The award was first presented in 1998.

The award is named in honor of the late Patty Kazmaier-Sandt, a four-year varsity letter winner and All Ivy League honoree for the Princeton University women's ice hockey team from 1981 through 1986. She also played field hockey and lacrosse.  She died on February 15, 1990, at the age of 28 from a rare blood disease.  Patty was the daughter of Heisman Trophy winner Dick Kazmaier.

Award winners

Winners by school

Finalists by school

Winners by State/Province

Finalists

See also

 List of sports awards honoring women
Hobey Baker Award - D-I men
Laura Hurd Award - D-III women
Sid Watson Award - D-III men

References

College ice hockey player of the year awards in the United States
NCAA Division I ice hockey
College women's ice hockey in the United States
Sports awards honoring women